Robert Nathan Banks (born December 10, 1963) is a former NFL defensive end.

Born in Williamsburg, Virginia, Banks attended Peninsula Catholic High School before transferring to Hampton High School in Hampton, Virginia, to play football. In 1982, the Touchdown Club of Columbus awarded Banks their second annual Sam B. Nicola Trophy, designating him as the National High School Player of the Year. Banks played for University of Notre Dame in the mid-1980s. He was drafted by the Houston Oilers football team in the 7th round (176th overall) of the 1987 NFL Draft. He played off the bench for one year in Houston before moving to the Cleveland Browns, where he started 15 games in 1989. He started 9 of the 15 games he played in 1990, which was his last year in the NFL.

As of 2016, he is the campus director of admissions for the Houston campus of the Aviation Institute of Maintenance.

References

NFL player biolgraphy of Robert Banks

1963 births
Living people
American football defensive ends
Notre Dame Fighting Irish football players
Houston Oilers players
Cleveland Browns players
Hampton High School (Virginia) alumni